Chernova is a surname. Notable people with the surname include:

Lada Chernova (born 1970), Russian javelin thrower
Natalia Chernova (born 1976), Russian trampolinist
Tatyana Chernova (born 1988), Russian heptathlete
Victoria Chernova, Russian paralympic athlete

See also
4207 Chernova, main-belt asteroid

Russian-language surnames